Trần Văn Khê (24 July 1921 - 24 June 2015) was a Vietnamese musicologist, academic, writer, teacher and performer of traditional music. He was father of the musician ethnomusicologist . His La musique viêtnamienne traditionnelle (Paris, 1962) was for many years a standard text of Vietnamese musicology.

He was director of research at CNRS and professor at the Sorbonne, and in 2008 named a  Honorary Member of the International Music Council of UNESCO where he is coordinator of the project "The Universe of Music, A History".

References

1921 births
2015 deaths
Vietnamese musicians
Vietnamese writers
Ethnomusicologists
Officiers of the Ordre des Arts et des Lettres
Research directors of the French National Centre for Scientific Research